The War of the Limburg Succession, was a conflict between 1283 and 1289 for the succession in the Duchy of Limburg.

The cause of the War of the Limburg Succession was the death of Waleran IV, Duke of Limburg in 1280, and his only daughter Ermengarde of Limburg in 1283. Waleran IV had no sons and Ermengarde had no children. Ermergarde had married Reginald I of Guelders, who now claimed the Duchy of Limburg. However, Waleran's nephew Adolf VIII of Berg, son of his elder brother Adolf VII of Berg, also claimed the Duchy. Unable to assert his claims, he sold them in 1283 to the mighty John I, Duke of Brabant.

Between 1283 and 1288, several smaller confrontations occurred between both sides, none of them decisive. Meanwhile, most of the other local powers chose sides. Siegfried II of Westerburg, the Archbishop of Cologne and ruler of the Electorate of Cologne, traditional enemy of the Duke of Brabant, forged an alliance with Reginald I, joined by Henry VI, Count of Luxembourg, and his brother Waleran I of Luxembourg, Lord of Ligny, as well as by Adolf, King of Germany. On the other side the Counts of Mark took the chance to affirm their independence from the Archbishop of Cologne and together with the Counts of Loon, Tecklenburg, and Waldeck allied with Brabant and Berg. The citizens of the City of Cologne, eager to emancipate themselves from the Archbishop's rule, also joined this alliance.

After the decisive Battle of Worringen in 1288, won by Duke John I of Brabant and his allies, the Duchy of Limburg came in the possession of the Duke of Brabant. The City of Cologne gained its independence from the Archbishopric and finally the status of an Imperial city in 1475.

References

1280s conflicts
13th century in the Netherlands
History of North Rhine-Westphalia
Limburg Succession
Duchy of Limburg
Limburg
1280s in Europe
1283 in Europe